Pileanthus vernicosus is a plant species of the family Myrtaceae endemic to Western Australia.

It blooms between September and November producing red flowers. The woody shrub has prominent oil glands and lives between 5 and 10 years. The twiggy branchlets are covered in small hardy evergreen leaves.

It is found on sand dunes and plains amongst coastal heath in the Gascoyne and Mid West regions of Western Australia between Shark Bay and Geraldton, where it grows in sandy soils.

References

vernicosus
Plants described in 1859
Endemic flora of Western Australia
Taxa named by Ferdinand von Mueller